Protolophus is a genus of harvestmen in the family Protolophidae from the Western US.

ITIS Taxonomic note:
While Protolophidae has been nested within Sclerosomatidae by some workers, it has been traditionally recognized as a separate family (Giribet et al., 2010); although a recent treatment (Kury in Zhang, 2013) does not recognize the family Protolophidae, others do (Hedin et al., 2012; Kury website 'Classification of Opiliones' (2014)).

Species
 Protolophus cockerelli C.J.Goodnight & M.L.Goodnight, 1942
 Protolophus differens C.J.Goodnight & M.L.Goodnight, 1942
 Protolophus dixiensis Chamberlin, 1925
 Protolophus hoffeinsi Elsaka, Mitov & Dunlop, 2019
 Protolophus longipes Schenkel, 1951
 Protolophus niger C.J.Goodnight & M.L.Goodnight, 1942
 Protolophus rossi C.J.Goodnight & M.L.Goodnight, 1943
 Protolophus singularis Banks, 1893
 Protolophus tuberculatus Banks, 1893

References

Harvestmen
Harvestman genera